Elections to Local Bodies in Karnataka are conducted once in five years to elect the representatives to the Urban and Rural local bodies. These elections are conducted by Karnataka State Election Commission

Elections were held in Karnataka on 3 September 2021 for the chairs and council members of all local bodies in the state. To the three levels of urban local bodies.

Urban Local bodies

Schedule 
The schedule of the election was announced by the State Election Commission on 11 August 2021. It announced that polling would be held in a single phase on 3 September and that results would be declared on 6 September. It also declared that the provisions of the Model Code of Conduct "came into force with immediate effect" with the said announcement.

City Corporations (Mahanagara Palikes)

Number of Contestants

Results

City Municipal Councils (Nagarasabhes)

Poll Percentage

Town Municipal Council (Purasabhe)

Poll Percentage

By Polls

Poll Percentage

See also 
 Elections in India
 2018 elections in India
 2018 Karnataka Legislative Assembly election

References

External links 
 Election Commission of India
 Karnataka Assembly Elections 2018
 Karnataka Elections 2018
 

September 2021 events in India
Local elections in Karnataka
2020s in Karnataka
Karnataka
2021 elections in India